The Wakatobi white-eye (Zosterops flavissimus) is a species of bird in the family Zosteropidae. It is endemic to Indonesia, where it is known only from the Wakatobi Islands off SE Sulawesi. It can be distinguished from most other Indonesian white-eyes by its bright yellow belly. It was formerly considered a subspecies of the lemon-bellied white-eye (Z. chloris), but it was long known to be reproductively isolated from the rest of the species, and a 2019 genetic study found it to be a distinct species.

References 

Zosterops
Endemic birds of Sulawesi
Birds described in 1903